The Isthmus goby (Arcygobius baliurus) is a species of goby native to marine and brackish waters of the Indian Ocean and the western Pacific Ocean where it can be found at depths of from .  This species lives on substrates consisting of a mix of sand and rubble.  This species grows to a length of  SL.  This species is the only known member of its genus.

References

External links
 Photograph

Gobiidae
Monotypic fish genera
Taxa named by Achille Valenciennes
Fish described in 1837